Marconi Communications, the former telecommunications arm of Britain's General Electric Company plc (GEC), was founded in August 1998 through the amalgamation of GEC Plessey Telecommunications (GPT) with other GEC subsidiaries: Marconi SpA, GEC Hong Kong, and ATC South Africa.

In December 1999, it became the principal subsidiary of Marconi plc, formed by renaming the remainder of GEC when GEC's defence arm, Marconi Electronic Systems, was sold to British Aerospace to form BAE Systems. Marconi plc was restructured to Marconi Corporation plc in May 2003.

Marconi Corporation used the cash raised by selling the defence arm to buy US telecoms companies, with the aim of becoming a major telecommunications systems provider. After losing most of its value in the subsequent dot-com bubble crash, and failing to win major contracts, in 2006 Ericsson acquired a majority of Marconi Corporation. The remainder of Marconi Corporation was renamed Telent.

History
Companies with "Marconi" in their name can trace their origins through a complex history of mergers, takeovers and divisions, to the 1963-established Marconi Company Ltd, founded in 1897 as the Wireless Telegraph & Signal Company by Guglielmo Marconi. The operations of Marconi were amalgamated into GEC in 1968, when GEC acquired the parent company of Marconi, English Electric.

Background: GEC acquisition of Plessey and GPT (1986–1998)
The evolution of Marconi Communications began in 1986, when the General Electric Company (GEC) attempted a takeover of Plessey, a British-based international electronics, defence and telecommunications company founded in 1917. The takeover bid was barred by regulatory authorities. As an amicable solution, GEC and Plessey merged their telecommunications businesses on 1 April 1988 as GEC Plessey Telecommunications (GPT). GPT was a world leader in many fields, for example synchronous digital hierarchy technology, and this brought together the two companies responsible for developing and building the System X telephone exchange, which was supposed to make selling System X simpler.

In 1989, GEC and the German conglomerate Siemens AG acquired the Plessey Company through their joint holding company, GEC Siemens plc. While most of Plessey's assets were divided between the companies, GPT remained a joint venture, with a 60/40 shareholding by GEC and Siemens, respectively. GEC Plessey Telecommunications was renamed to "GPT", which would continue to exist merely as a legal entity.

During the mid-1990s, the name GPT gradually disappeared in the UK. By October 1997 the joint venture, through a series of Siemens mergers and acquisitions in the UK, evolved into Siemens GEC Communication Systems, which in 1998 merged with Siemens Business Communication Systems to form the largest division of Siemens AG: Siemens Communications.

In August 1998, GEC acquired Siemens' 40% stake in GPT (at this point only existing as a legal entity), and merged GPT with the telecoms units of its other subsidiaries – Marconi SpA, GEC Hong Kong, and ATC South Africa – to form Marconi Communications.

Marconi (1999–2005)
In December 1999, GEC's defence arm, Marconi Electronic Systems, was sold to British Aerospace, forming BAE Systems. The remainder of GEC was renamed Marconi, and Marconi Communications became its principal subsidiary.

Following the announcement of the Marconi Electronic Systems demerger on 19 January 1999, GEC focused on the booming telecoms sector.  It purchased two American equipment-makers to complement its existing telecommunications businesses, RELTEC Corporation (March 1999) and FORE Systems (April 1999). Both acquisitions occurred during the peak of the dot-com bubble. The £2.8bn price for FORE Systems and the £1.3n spent on RELTEC took a heavy toll on Marconi following the bursting of the bubble in 2000/2001.

In the first half of 2001, some of Marconi's major competitors such as Lucent Technologies and Alcatel had issued profit warnings, citing a large drop in orders from large telecoms groups. Marconi executives meanwhile reassured investors; the Financial Times judged they were "either failing to see the warning signs, or ignoring them." However, in late June and early July it became evident that group sales had suffered a massive decline and by 3 July it was clear that a profits warning was inevitable.  This was complicated by the fact that Marconi was to announce the sale of its medical unit to Philips for $1.1 billion.  The company's shares would have to be suspended so that investors could not trade its shares without full information.  At 7.26am on Wednesday 4 July the Philips transaction was announced, and 15 minutes later Marconi announced the suspension of its shares. Following a contentious board meeting that evening, Marconi announced 4,000 job cuts, a 15% drop in sales forecasts, and a 50% fall in operating profit to March 2002. When trading resumed the following day, the share price dropped 54%. This valued the company at £2.8 billion, compared to £35.5 billion in September 2000. John Mayo, the deputy chief executive, was dismissed as a result.  A second profits warning in September 2001 led to the dismissal of Lord Simpson (the CEO) and Sir Roger Hurn (Chairman).

In June 2001 Marconi sold its Ipsaris business to Easynet in an all-share deal worth over £300 million. Ipsaris was a network provider owning one of the largest backbones in the UK at the time, with 3,500 kilometers of optical fibre running alongside the UK canal network. The deal resulted in Marconi owning a 72% stake in Easynet. However, by March 2002 demand for space on the Easynet network had slumped and Easynet effectively mothballed the Ipsaris fibre optic network, and the value of the entire network was written down from £350 million to £15 million.   

On 19 May 2003, Marconi underwent a major restructuring into Marconi Corporation. In a debt-for-equity swap, the firm's creditors received 99.5% of the new company's shares, while Marconi shareholders received one Marconi Corporation share for every 559 Marconi shares.

In July 2003 Marconi sold 32% of its stake in Easynet for £40.5 million and in September 2003 it sold its remaining 40% stake for £56.7 million, in an effort to pay off debt and increase the liquidity in Easynet shares.  

The company was a major supplier of asynchronous transfer mode, gigabit Ethernet, and Internet Protocol products. In 2005, it failed to secure any part of BT's 21st Century Network (21CN) programme. That Marconi received no major 21CN contract was a surprise to commentators, and sent the company's shares tumbling. An example of analysis before BT announced the winners of contracts is Dresdner Kleinwort Wasserstein's: "[Marconi is] so advanced with its products and so entrenched with BT Group that its selection looks certain."

Various bids began to be made for the business, including one by Huawei Technologies, with whom Marconi already had a joint venture. The majority of Marconi Corporation's businesses, including Marconi Communications, were sold to Ericsson in 2005, and the remainder was renamed Telent.

Operations
In September 2000, Marconi announced the formation of global Technology Centers.

The three Enterprise Technology Centers were based in San Jose, California; Vienna, Virginia; and Israel. The San Jose Technology Center, which had been responsible for management of Marconi's gigabit Ethernet solutions, broadened its research focus to include development of application-oriented platforms, connection-oriented uplinks between connection and connectionless networks, deep packet inspection solutions, and predictable quality of service. The center in Israel concentrated its research and development on AI-based network behavior and the Virginia center focused on AI-based network management.

References

External links
Official website, archived in June 2005

British companies established in 1998
Companies formerly listed on the London Stock Exchange
Computer companies of the United Kingdom
Defunct telecommunications companies of the United Kingdom
Computer companies established in 1998
Electronics companies established in 1998
Engineering companies of the United Kingdom
General Electric Company
Computer companies disestablished in 2006
Electronics companies disestablished in 2006
2006 mergers and acquisitions
Ericsson
British companies disestablished in 2006